Prognoz, also known as SO (Solar Object, first three satellites), SO-M (SO-modified, next seven satellites) and SO-M2 (last two satellites, also known as Interball) was a Soviet scientific research satellite programme. Twelve Prognoz satellites were launched between 14 April 1972 and 29 August 1996, by Molniya-M carrier rockets. The satellites were placed in High Earth orbits. First ten Prognoz spacescrafts were launched from Site 31/6 at the Baikonur Cosmodrome and last two from Site 43/3 at the Plesetsk Cosmodrome.

The satellites were primarily used for Solar research, however the later satellites were used for other research, including research into the Big Bang theory, and Earth's magnetosphere. The tenth satellite was used as part of the Interkosmos programme.

Satellites

See also
Interkosmos

References

Earth observation satellites of the Soviet Union
4MV